Pyotr Borisovich Ryazanov (– 11 October 1942) was a Russian composer, teacher, and musicologist.

Biography
Born in Narva into a musical family, he entered the Saint Petersburg Conservatory, where he studied composition with Nikolay Sokolov and Aleksandr Zhitomirsky, orchestration with Maximilian Steinberg and fugue with Leonid Vladimirovich Nikolayev.

Ryazanov started teaching at the Conservatory in 1925. He taught, among others, Georgy Sviridov, Andria Balanchivadze, Nikita Bogoslovsky, Aleksandre Machavariani, Anatoly Novikov, Tamara Antonovna Shaverzashvili, Dagmara Slianova-Mizandari, Vasily Solovyov-Sedoi, Orest Yevlakhov, Boris Mayzel, and Ivan Dzerzhinsky.

He was particularly interested in folk music.

Ryazanov was evacuated from Leningrad to Tashkent during the blockade. He died in Tbilisi from typhoid fever.

References

Material from Grove Biography

External links
Grove entry on Ryazanov
Biography (Russian)

1899 births
1942 deaths
Russian composers
Russian male composers
People from Narva
Deaths from typhoid fever
20th-century composers
20th-century Russian male musicians